10th (County of London) Battalion, London Regiment (Hackney) was a battalion of the London Regiment, the only all-Territorial Force regiment in the British Army. The battalion existed between 1912 and 1955 and was later re-attached to the Rifle Brigade, Royal Berkshire Regiment and Royal Artillery.

History

1912-1918
It was formed in 1912 to replace the London Regiment's disbanded 10th (County of London) Battalion (Paddington Rifles) and took over its battalion numeral. Now demolished, the new battalion's drill hall was sited on The Grove in Hackney. In September 1914 a 2/10th Battalion London Regiment was formed as part of 2/2nd London Brigade in 2/1st London Division, with the existing regiment renamed 1/10th Battalion. On its mobilisation in August 1914 1/0th Battalion moved to Bullswater Camp near Pirbright then the following month to Crowborough - 2/9th Battalion joined it at Crowborough that November.

1/10th formed part of 3rd London Brigade, itself part of 1st London Division - that brigade was renamed 162nd Brigade in 54th (East Anglian) Division the following year. The battalion sailed from Plymouth for Gallipoli in late July 1915 with the rest of its brigade, stopping at Mudros en route and landing at Suvla Bay on 11 August 1915. It was evacuated from Gallipoli that December and stationed in Egypt for the rest of the war. A 3/10th Battalion was also formed in 1915.

On 7 July 1916, 1/10th and 3/10th Battalions London Regiment were both transferred to the corps of the Rifle Brigade whilst retaining their London Regiment affiliation. 1/10th kept its old name whilst 3/10th absorbed 3rd/25th Battalion London Regiment and was renamed 10th (Reserve) Battalion. 2/10th and 3/10th Battalions were disbanded by or at the war's end. The 1/10th, 2/10th and 3/10th Battalions' First World War memorial is at the Church of St John-at-Hackney.

1920-1955
During the Territorial Force's 1920-1921 conversion into the Territorial Army 1/10th Battalion's transfer to the Rifle Brigade was formalised and it was renamed 10th London Regiment (Hackney), The Rifle Brigade. In 1929 it was transferred again, this time becoming 5th (Hackney) Battalion, Royal Berkshire Regiment (Princess Charlotte of Wales's) and moving its headquarters to Hilman Street in Hackney.

In June 1939 elements of 5th Battalion were split off to create a duplicate 7th (Stoke Newington) Battalion, which served on home defence throughout the Second World War. On the outbreak of war 5th Battalion was serving with its duplicate 7th Battalion in the 161st (Essex) Infantry Brigade, 54th (East Anglian) Division. 5th Battalion was an ordinary infantry battalion until 1942 when it was converted to No. 8 Beach Group, playing an important part in the Normandy landings, where it landed with the 3rd Canadian Infantry Division at Juno Beach on D-Day itself and was responsible for the landing ground. Although still technically a Beach Group it served as infantry in the Battle of Normandy, losing all but 16 officers and 136 other ranks by August 1944, when it was disbanded.

In February 1945 5th Battalion was reformed and re-designated as a Bank Group and assisted 15th (Scottish) Infantry Division in its crossing of the Rhine in March 1945. After this it served as normal infantry until the battalion was disbanded in June 1945. Throughout its existence, some sources state the battalion was nicknamed The Hackney Ghurkhas. 5th (Hackney) Battalion was revived as 648th Heavy Anti-Aircraft Regiment, Royal Artillery (Royal Berkshire) in 1947 before finally being disbanded in 1955.

Battle honours

First World War

1/10th Battalion
 Suvla
 Landing at Suvla
 Scimitar Hill
 Gallipoli 1915
 Egypt 1915-17
 Gaza
 El Mughar
 Nebi Samwil
 Jaffa
 Tell' Asur
 Megiddo
 Sharon
 Palestine 1917-18

2/10th Battalion
 Ypres 1917
 Menin Road
 Polygon Wood
 Passchendaele
 Villers Bretonneux
 Amiens
 Somme 1918
 Albert 1918
 Bapaume 1918
 Hindenburg Line
 Epéhy
 Pursuit to Mons
 France and Flanders 1917-18

Second World War
 Normandy Landing
 Rhine
 North West Europe 1944-45

Notes

References

History of the London Borough of Hackney
Battalions of the London Regiment (1908–1938)
Military units and formations in London
Military units and formations established in 1912
Military units and formations disestablished in 1955
Military units and formations of the British Army in World War II